The solar eclipse of May 20, 2012 (May 21, 2012 local time in the Eastern Hemisphere) was an annular solar eclipse that was visible in a band spanning through Eastern Asia, the Pacific Ocean, and North America. As a partial solar eclipse, it was visible from northern Greenland to Hawaii, and from eastern Indonesia at sunrise to northwestern Mexico at sunset. The moon's apparent diameter was smaller because the eclipse was occurring only 32 1/2 hours after apogee.

A solar eclipse is an astronomical phenomenon that occurs when the Moon passes between Earth and the Sun, thereby totally or partly obscuring the image of the Sun for a viewer on Earth. An annular solar eclipse occurs when the Moon's apparent diameter is smaller than the Sun's, blocking most of the Sun's light and causing the Sun to look like an annulus (ring). An annular eclipse appears as a partial eclipse over a region of the Earth thousands of kilometres wide.

The annular eclipse was the first visible from the contiguous United States since the solar eclipse of May 10, 1994 (Saros 128), and the first in Asia since the solar eclipse of January 15, 2010 (Saros 141). The path of the eclipse's antumbra included heavily populated regions of China and Japan, and an estimated 100 million people in those areas were capable of viewing annularity. In the western United States, its path included 8 states, and an estimated 6 million people were capable of viewing annularity. It was the 58th eclipse of the 128th Saros cycle, which began with a partial eclipse on August 29, 984 AD and will conclude with a partial eclipse on November 1, 2282.

Visibility and viewing

The longest duration of annularity was 5 minutes and 43 seconds, occurring just south of the Aleutian Islands. The eclipse began on a Monday and ended on the previous Sunday, as it crossed the International Date Line.

Asia
The annular eclipse commenced over the Chinese province of Guangxi at sunrise, at 6:06 a.m. China Standard Time. Travelling northeast, the antumbra of the eclipse approached and passed over the cities of Macau, Hong Kong, Guangzhou, and Xiamen, reaching Taipei by 6:10 a.m NST. After crossing the East China Sea, it passed over much of eastern Japan, including Osaka and Tokyo at 7:28 a.m and 7:32 a.m JST respectively, before entering the Pacific Ocean. The penumbra of the eclipse was visible throughout Eastern Asia and various islands in the Pacific Ocean until noon.

The path of the antumbra over highly populated areas allowed at least an estimated 100 million people to view annularity. Because the eclipse took place during the summer monsoon season in Southeast Asia, viewing conditions were not ideal in some areas, including Hong Kong.

North America
After traveling approximately 4,000 miles (6,500 kilometers) across the Pacific Ocean, the antumbra entered North America between the coastlines of Oregon and California, reaching the coastal city of Eureka, California at 6:25 p.m PDT. After passing over Medford, Oregon and Redding, California, it had reached Reno, Nevada by 6:28 p.m PDT. The eclipse continued to travel southeast, passing 30 miles (48 km) north of Las Vegas, Nevada, over St. George, Utah, and reaching the Grand Canyon by approximately 6:33 p.m MST. After passing over Albuquerque, New Mexico and Lubbock, Texas, the eclipse terminated above central Texas at sunset, 8:38 p.m. CST. An estimated 6.6 million people lived under the path of the antumbra. The penumbra was visible throughout most of North America, including the islands of Hawaii.

Related eclipses

Eclipses of 2012 
 An annular solar eclipse on May 20.
 A partial lunar eclipse on June 4.
 A total solar eclipse on November 13.
 A penumbral lunar eclipse on November 28.

Solar eclipses 2011–2014

Saros 128

Tritos series

Metonic series

Inex series

Notes

References

2012 5 20
2012 05 20
2012 in science
Articles containing video clips
May 2012 events
Solar Eclipse Articles